The Czechoslovak Agrarian and Conservative Party (ČSAK, Czech: Československá strana agrární a konservativní) was a conservative and agrarian political party in Czechoslovakia existed in year of 1925. Party was led by former chairman of the Republican Party of Farmers and Peasants Karel Prášek. Party dissolved in same year after failed to gain any seats in the 1925 Czechoslovak parliamentary election.

References

Political parties in Czechoslovakia
Defunct agrarian political parties
Defunct conservative parties
Political parties established in 1925
Political parties disestablished in 1925
1925 establishments in Czechoslovakia
1925 disestablishments in Czechoslovakia